Animal feed is food given to domestic animals, especially livestock,  in the course of animal husbandry. There are two basic types: fodder and forage. Used alone, the word feed more often refers to fodder. Animal feed is an important input to animal agriculture, and is frequently the main cost of the raising or keeping of  animals. Farms typically try to reduce cost for this food, by growing their own, grazing animals, or supplementing expensive feeds with substitutes, such as food waste like spent grain from beer brewing.

Animal wellbeing is highly dependent on feed that reflects a well balanced nutrition. Some modern agricultural practices, such as fattening cows on grains or in feed lots, have detrimental effects on the environment and animals. For example, increased corn or other grain in feed for cows, makes their microbiomes more acidic weakening their immune systems and making cows a more likely vector for E.coli. While other feeding practices can improve animal impacts. For example, feeding cows certain kinds of seaweed, reduces their production of methane, reducing the greenhouse gases from meat production.

When an environmental crisis strikes farmers or herders, such as a drought or extreme weather driven by climate change, farmers often have to shift to more expensive manufactured animal feed, which can negatively effect their economic viability. For example, a 2017 drought in Senegal reduced the availability of grazing lands leading to skyrocketing demand and prices for manufactured animal feed, caused farmers to sell large portions of their herds. Additionally agriculture for producing animal feed puts pressure on land use:  feed crops need land that otherwise might be used for human food and can be  one of the driving factors for deforestation, soil degradation and climate change.

Fodder 

"Fodder" refers particularly to foods or forages given to the animals (including plants cut and carried to them), rather than that which they forage for themselves.  It includes hay, straw, silage, compressed and pelleted feeds, oils and mixed rations, and sprouted grains and legumes. Grass and crop residues are the most important source of animal feed globally. Grains account for 11% of the total dry matter consume by livestock at global level and oilseed crops by-products such as soybean cakes account for 5%. The amount of grain used to produce the same unit of meat varies substantially between species and production systems. According to FAO, ruminants require an average of 2.8 kg of grains to produce 1 kg of meat while monogastrics require 3.2. These figures vary between 0.1 for extensive ruminant systems to 9.4 in beef feedlots, and from 0.1 in backyard chicken production t4 if industrial pig production. Farmed fish can also be fed on grain and use even less than poultry.  The two most important feed grains are maize and soybean, and the United States is by far the largest exporter of both, averaging about half of the global maize trade and 40% of the global soya trade in the years leading up the 2012 drought. Other feed grains include wheat, oats, barley, and rice, among many others.

Traditional sources of animal feed include household food scraps and the byproducts of food processing industries such as milling and brewing. Material remaining from milling oil crops like peanuts, soy, and corn are important sources of fodder. Scraps fed to pigs are called slop, and those fed to chicken are called chicken scratch.  Brewer's spent grain is a byproduct of beer making that is widely used as animal feed.

 is fodder that is blended from various raw materials and additives. These blends are formulated according to the specific requirements of the target animal. They are manufactured by feed compounders as meal type, pellets or crumbles.  The main ingredients used in commercially prepared feed are the feed grains, which include corn, soybeans, sorghum, oats, and barley.

Compound feed may also include premixes, which may also be sold separately.  Premixes are composed of microingredients such as vitamins, minerals, chemical preservatives, antibiotics, fermentation products, and other ingredients that are purchased from premix companies, usually in sacked form, for blending into commercial rations. Because of the availability of these products, farmers who use their own grain can formulate their own rations and be assured that their animals are getting the recommended levels of minerals and vitamins, although they are still subject to the Veterinary Feed Directive.

According to the American Feed Industry Association, as much as $20 billion worth of feed ingredients are purchased each year. These products range from grain mixes to orange rinds and beet pulps. The feed industry is one of the most competitive businesses in the agricultural sector and is by far the largest purchaser of U.S. corn, feed grains, and soybean meal. Tens of thousands of farmers with feed mills on their own farms are able to compete with huge conglomerates with national distribution. Feed crops generated $23.2 billion in cash receipts on U.S. farms in 2001. At the same time, farmers spent a total of $24.5 billion on feed that year.

In 2011, around 734.5 million tons of feed were produced annually around the world.

History 

The US Animal Drug Availability Act 1996, passed during the Clinton era, was the first attempt in that country to regulate the use of medicated feed.

In 1997, in response to outbreaks of Bovine spongiform encephalopathy, commonly known as mad cow disease, the United States and Canada banned a range of animal tissues from cattle feed. Feed bans in United States (2009) Canada (2007) expanded on this, prohibiting the use of potentially infectious tissue in all animal and pet food and fertilizers.

Forage

Manufacture

Nutrition
In agriculture today, the nutritional needs of farm animals are well understood and may be satisfied through natural forage and fodder alone, or augmented by direct supplementation of nutrients in concentrated, controlled form. The nutritional quality of feed is influenced not only by the nutrient content, but also by many other factors such as feed presentation, hygiene, digestibility, and effect on intestinal health.

Feed additives provide a mechanism through which these nutrient deficiencies can be resolved, improving animal rate of growth, health, and well-being. Many farm animals have a diet largely consisting of grain-based ingredients because of the higher costs of quality feed.

Major ingredients

Chelates

Insects

Soy

By animal 
 Bird feed
Cat food
 Cattle feeding
 Dog food
 Equine nutrition
 Fish feed
 Pet food
 Pig farming
 Poultry feed
 Sheep husbandry

See also 
 Appetein
 FEFANA
 Hammermill
 Pellet mill

References

External links

 Animal feed legislation and guidance 
 FAO Feed Safety guidelines
 Feed - Biosecurity Guide
 Infographic: A look at the global feed production 2012

 
Animal husbandry
Medicated feed